The Darkhovin Nuclear Power Plant (also known as Esteghlal Nuclear Power Plant or Karoon) is a planned nuclear power plant located in Khuzestan province, Iran about 70 kilometers south of Ahvaz at the Karun river. Construction of one reactor has started. Some other projects on this site were cancelled.

History 
Before the Iranian Revolution, Iran had signed a 2 billion dollar contract with French company Framatome to build two 910 MW pressurized water reactors, at Darkhovin. After the Revolution, France withdrew from the project and the engineering components of the plant were withheld in France. The Iranian components were then used to build the units 5 and 6 of Gravelines Nuclear Power Station in France which went online in 1985. Construction of the power station was halted during Iran–Iraq War. In 1992, Iran signed an agreement with China to build two 300 MW reactors at the site, which were to be completed within ten years and would have been similar to Chashma Nuclear Power Plant in Pakistan which is built by China. But later on China withdrew from the project under United States pressure.

The project was subsequently taken up by Iran itself, as no other country was ready to cooperate in its construction. Iran started to indigenously design the reactor for Darkhovin Nuclear Power Plant basing the design on IR-40 reactor using heavy water. The Iranian nuclear reactor design has a capacity of 360 MW. The plant was announced in 2008, originally scheduled to come online in 2016, but construction has been delayed. There is currently no public information on how many reactors the power station is planned to house. The plant is going to be Iran's first indigenously designed and built nuclear power plant besides the research reactor of IR-40. According to the head of Iran's Atomic Energy agency Abbas Salehi, Swiss-Swedish conglomerate ABB has been retained as a partner/external consultant in this project in recent years but has pulled out because of the international sanctions.

In May 2022, the deputy head of the Atomic Energy Organization of Iran said that planning for the construction of an indigenous 360 MWe plant was in progress.
On 3 December 2022, Iranian state TV announced that construction of an indigenous 300 MW plant had started, expected to take eight years to build and cost about $1.5 to $2 billion.

In fiction
In 1976 novel of Paul Erdman, Crash of '79, Darkhovin Nuclear Power Plant is mentioned to have been completed by France and Mohammed Reza Pahlavi the then Shah of Iran uses the plant with the help from Israel and Switzerland to manufacture a dozen salted bombs.

Reactor data
Plans for the site are not clear.

See also

 List of power stations in Iran
 International rankings of Iran
 Bushehr Nuclear Power Plant
 IR-40
 Operation Merlin
 Green Salt Project
 Oghab 2

References

External links
 Documentary: Nuclear confrontation with Iran

Nuclear power stations in Iran
Nuclear program of Iran
Nuclear power stations with reactors under construction
Nuclear power stations with proposed reactors